Filipe Correia Soares (born 27 January 2000) is a Portuguese footballer who plays for Ferreira de Aves as a defender.

Football career
He made his professional debut for Académico Viseu on 8 February 2020 in the LigaPro.

References

External links

2000 births
Living people
People from Viseu
Portuguese footballers
Association football defenders
Liga Portugal 2 players
Campeonato de Portugal (league) players
Académico de Viseu F.C. players
Sportspeople from Viseu District